Oxbow is a brand of clothing and athletic equipment. Since its creation in 1985 in Pont-Audemer, France, Oxbow has positioned itself in the world of boardsports as an international brand. Oxbow restarted the World Longboard Championship in 1992, and sponsors athletes such as surfer Laird Hamilton and windsurfer Jason Polakow. Oxbow's Back to Powder winter event draws some of the best skiers and snowboarders in the world. The business is involved in five sports: surfing, windsurfing, kitesurfing, snowboarding, and skiing. Oxbow became an affiliate of the French group Lafuma in 2005.

Team Oxbow
 Laird Hamilton, surf
 Matt Meola, surf
 Duane De Soto, longboard
 Jérémie Eloy, kitesurf
 Jason Polakow, windsurf
 Ludovic Stohl, snowboard
 Laurent Favre, ski
 David Livet, snowboard
 Eduardo Bagé, longboard
 Jennifer Flanigan, longboard girl

References

External links
 Oxbow website

Clothing companies of France
Surfwear brands
Swimwear brands
Clothing companies established in 1985
1985 establishments in France
Gironde